Shri Silvius Condpan, a politician from the Indian National Congress party, was a Member of the Parliament of India representing Assam in the Rajya Sabha, the upper house of the Indian Parliament. He died in Delhi on 10 October 2011 of complications from diabetes.  The Rajya Sabha vacancy caused by his demise has been filled by Pankaj Bora, former Minister in the Assam government. He was born in July 1938 at Sonitpur District, Assam.

References

People from Sonitpur district
Indian National Congress politicians from Assam
Janata Party politicians
Rajya Sabha members from Assam
1938 births
2011 deaths